The Atlantic City Conference held between 13–16 May 1929 was a historic summit of leaders of organized crime in the United States. It is considered by most crime historians to be the earliest organized crime summit held in the US. The conference had a major impact on the future direction of the criminal underworld and it held more importance and significance than the Havana Conference of 1946 and the Apalachin meeting of 1957. It also represented the first concrete move toward a National Crime Syndicate.

Details about the conference are difficult to verify.  However, it is thought that crime leaders at the conference discussed the violent bootleg wars in New York City and Chicago and how to avoid them in the future, diversification and investment into legal liquor ventures, expansion of illegal operations to offset profit loss from the probable repeal of Prohibition, and reorganization and consolidation of the underworld into a National Crime Syndicate.

The conference
In early May 1929, Meyer Lansky, the Jewish-American crime syndicate boss, was married and he and his closest underworld friends concluded that the resort town of Atlantic City, New Jersey, would be an ideal place to have both a honeymoon and also a conference, allowing Lansky to mix pleasure and business, along with the rest of the bosses. The date and place was set for the weekend of May 13–May 16, making the conference the first known underworld summit of its kind, which could be considered the first concrete move towards establishing the National Crime Syndicate that eventually controlled all major criminal activities across the United States.

The Atlantic City Conference was said to be hosted by Meyer Lansky, Italian-American mobster Johnny Torrio, Charlie "Lucky" Luciano and Frank Costello. The organizing host of the conference was Atlantic City and South Jersey crime boss, Enoch "Nucky" Johnson, who provided the hotel accommodations, food and entertainment for all, while making a guarantee of no police interference.

The largest delegation in the conference came from the New York/New Jersey area and included mobsters Johnny "The Fox" Torrio, formerly of Chicago, Charlie "Lucky" Luciano, Frank Costello, Giuseppe "Joe Adonis" Doto and Vito Genovese, all top members of Manhattan's powerful Masseria Family, Albert "The Mad Hatter" Anastasia, Frank "Cheech" Scalise and Vincent Mangano, from the D'Aquila/Mineo Family of Manhattan, Gaetano "Tommy Brown" Lucchese, represented the Reina Family out of the Bronx, Quarico "Willie Moore" Moretti, represented the Masseria Family's Newark, New Jersey, interests, Meyer "The Brain" Lansky and Benny "Bugsy" Siegel, bosses of the Bugs and Meyer Mob, who protected liquor shipments in the New York/New Jersey areas, Louis "Lepke" Buchalter and Jacob "Gurrah" Shapiro, considered the underworld's "Rockefellers" and also known as the "Gorilla Boys", Abner "Longy" Zwillman, also representing Newark, New Jersey, Dutch Schultz, Bronx beer baron and Harlem numbers king, Owen "Owney the Killer" Madden, boss of Manhattan's Hell's Kitchen and the Irish Combine, Frank Erickson, former Rothstein Lt., Costello associate and future bookmaking kingpin.

Chicago was represented by Alphonse "Scarface" Capone, Frank "The Enforcer" Nitti, Jake "Greasy Thumb" Guzik, Frank "Frank Cline" Rio, top members of the South Side Capone Gang and representing Mid West interests, Capone bodyguard and only one of two Irish gangsters present Frank McErlane of the South Side Saltis/McErlane Gang. From Philadelphia came the top Jewish-American bosses, Irving "Waxey Gordon" Wexler, Harry "Nig Rosen" Stromberg, Max "Boo Boo" Hoff, Irving "Bitzy" Bitz and Charles Schwartz. From Cleveland came the "Little Jewish Navy" of Morris "Moe" Dalitz and Louis "Lou Roddy" Rothkopf, along with adopted Polizzi Family member, Leo "Charles Polizzi" Berkowitz who represented "Little Italy's" "Mayfield Road Mob". The feared Purple Gang of Detroit was represented by Abe Bernstein and his brother Joseph "Bugs Bill" Bernstein. Boston's most prominent bootlegger, Charles "King" Solomon was present, while Kansas City's "Balestrere Gang" and the "Pendergast Machine" were represented by boss John Lazia. Delegations from Florida and Louisiana were also present at the time, which would most likely be, Luciano and Costello allies, Santo Trafficante, Sr. of Tampa and Sylvestro "Silver Dollar Sam" Carolla of New Orleans.

Two of the underworld's most powerful leaders, Giuseppe "Joe the Boss" Masseria and Salvatore Maranzano of New York were not invited. The old guard or "Mustache Petes" maintained traditional old world ideals and business practices that restricted them from working with other ethnic gangs outside of the Italian underworld, this was counter to the ideals and principles that the leaders, such as Luciano and Torrio wished to express to the other delegates in Atlantic City. At the time of the conference, future underworld power, Joseph "Joe Bananas" Bonanno was Maranzano's top lieutenant and aide and was not invited to Atlantic City, though he would soon become one of the architects of the "National Crime Syndicate" and the La Cosa Nostra Commission.

The conference started off with an apparent embarrassing incident for some of those invited who tried to check into the first hotel Nucky Johnson had them registered, namely at the exclusive Atlantic City Breakers Hotel along the Boardwalk, which then was restricted to white Anglo-Saxon Protestant clients (in later years, the Breakers Hotel catered to a mainly Jewish clientele, becoming known as "The Aristocrat of Kosher Hotels"). Once the hotel's management found out multiple guests were trying to check in with Anglo Saxon aliases, some delegates were refused admittance. Subsequently, Johnson heard about the problem and rushed over to the hotel to mitigate the situation. Al Capone being himself screamed at Nucky Johnson for not making the proper arrangements and a loud argument ensued between the two gangsters while the others watched and hoped they would not come to blows. Suddenly Johnson who was taller and heavier than Capone pushed him into a limousine and ordered every one to follow him. They headed for the Ritz-Carlton and Ambassador hotels and when Capone reached the hotel he ripped several framed paintings and photos off the walls of the hotel and started to throw them at Nucky Johnson. The others concentrated on keeping Al Capone calm and quiet for the time being.

For the first three days there were a constant round of parties at the hotels with Nucky Johnson supplying plenty of liquor, food and girls for entertainment. For the guests who brought their wives or girlfriends, Johnson provided the women with fur capes as gifts. Meyer Lansky who was the new bridegroom and guest of honor received the Presidential suite at the Ritz Hotel, with a constant supply of champagne for him and his wife Anna.

There were several important items to discuss among the attendees such as constant competition for imported and bootleg liquor profits among the gangs, what to do about the liquor business if or when Prohibition ends, greater investment in gambling operations and what to do about the Chicago violence problem. The Atlantic City delegates conducted their more serious discussions and business, privately in conference rooms atop the Ritz and Ambassador Hotels. Not all the meetings were held in a room around a long table, some discussions were held out in the open, with the delegates taking their socks off and rolling up their pants for walks along the beach, on the sand and in the open air. This made the Conference no great secret, with local newspapers carrying photos of Al Capone and some of the other prominent delegates as they cruised down the Jersey shore boardwalk and beaches, dipping their feet into the water.

Important decisions were made to stop competing with each other during the remainder of Prohibition and cooperate in pooling their resources to maximize profits and develop a national monopoly in the illegal liquor business. One of the most important discussions was what to do when Prohibition ended. The bosses decided to reorganize themselves and their gangs into cooperative organizations, investing in legitimate breweries, distilleries and liquor importation franchises. By making investments in the legitimate liquor business and by owning nightclubs, bars and restaurants to distribute the liquor and maximize profits, this gave the Syndicate some security against the repeal of Prohibition.

The delegates held discussions about taking a larger interest in illegal and cooperative gambling activities such as bookmaking, horse racing and casinos. The New York and Chicago representatives laid out a plan to tie in the national wire service for horse racing bettors with the Daily Racing Form and to lay off bets throughout the United States. This idea was introduced to the conference delegates after Al Capone ran into Chicago's Moses Annenberg who controlled the mob that enforced distribution of William R. Hearst's newspapers in the Chicago area. The Families in New York and Chicago would oversee and direct operations for this cooperative and very lucrative venture. New York bosses, Frank Costello and Meyer Lansky were chosen as directors to coordinate the operations along with Chicago representatives. New York's future layoff king and gambling czar Frank Erickson was chosen to oversee the organization of the operation along with Chicago's Moses Annenberg. Chicago businessman and underworld associate Moses Annenberg was not originally invited to the conference, but after running into Capone, the well known Annenberg was most likely invited to confer with the leaders on business matters concerning the national race wire.

It was agreed by the conference delegates that investments in the legitimate liquor business and gambling was the way to offset the loss of profits from the end of Prohibition and discussions to divide the country into exclusive franchises and territories for the bosses and their gangs were started at the Atlantic City Conference.

Another important topic was the ongoing violence and bloodletting that was occurring in Chicago. The underworld wars in Chicago and to some extent New York, had brought about a public and media outcry on law enforcement to stop the violence. There had been added media and law enforcement attention and this was placing pressure on underworld rackets and operations around the country. Most of the pressure was due to the recent St. Valentine's Day Massacre in Chicago. With former Al Capone boss and mentor Johnny Torrio taking the lead and Charlie "Lucky" Luciano and the other delegates backing him up, Capone was chosen as a sacrificial lamb to ease the heat brought on the underworld and its leaders. Al Capone was convinced after much debate to allow himself to be arrested on a minor charge and sent to prison for a short period of time, deflecting the media and law enforcement pressure for the good of the whole underworld. After the conference was concluded, Chicago underworld boss Al Capone and his bodyguard Frank Rio went to Philadelphia where two friendly cops arrested and charged them with carrying a gun. Al Capone and Frank Rio were sentenced to a year in prison, but were released and back in Chicago after several months.

The future of organized crime
Before the end of the conference, emphasis was laid on the fact that all of the future plans and operations had to be appropriated and administered peacefully among the country's bosses and criminal organizations, avoiding the sort of violent conflicts that had plagued the underworld in the past. The highly successful "Big Seven Group" was used as a model of future organization and peace for the new "National Syndicate". New York bosses, Giuseppe "Joe the Boss" Masseria and Salvatore Maranzano, were two old guard mafiosi who held a lot of power and influence nationally and could not be taken lightly. The two major underworld powers were ready to square off in a war, which was seen as running counter to the organizational plans for the future the Atlantic City delegates had agreed upon.

The leaders that attended the conference all agreed that to continue with the Syndicate's future plans, the old guard or "Mustache Petes" would have to be eliminated eventually. It was understood that New York's Charlie Luciano and Meyer Lansky group, along with their alliance of up and coming "Young Turks" would have to deal with the old line bosses once the time was right. This led Benjamin "Bugsy" Siegel and Lansky to disband the Bugs & Meyer Mob group and found their Murder, Inc. organisation several years later, where they worked for Luciano as hitmen. Before Siegel moved to California in the late 1930s, the organisation was passed on to Albert Anastasia and Louis Buchalter.

Meanwhile, the new national alliance or Syndicate in Chicago, Detroit, Boston, Philadelphia and elsewhere would back up the New York forces through removal of the old guard in their areas if need be. It was clear to the delegates at the Atlantic City Conference that Charlie "Lucky" Luciano was a leader who commanded great respect and would eventually become first among equals in the Syndicate. It was at the Conference where Benjamin "Bugsy" Siegel and Meyer "The Brain" Lansky met with Charlie "Lucky" Luciano, several years before founding their Murder, Inc. organisation and working for Luciano as a hitman.

Atlantic City delegates
The terms capo and consigliere were not used until Salvatore Maranzano labeled the Italian underworld Cosa Nostra in 1931; the terms lieutenant and advisor were more common at the time, except with the Maranzano family, (future Bonanno crime family), which had already been following the strict Cosa Nostra traditions of their native Sicily. The position of consigliere did not exist until Charlie "Lucky" Luciano became the de facto first amongst equals in La Cosa Nostra and added the position to the Family hierarchy in 1931, when he formed the Commission.

Underworld members, city or delegation they represented and their rank at time of conference:

Atlantic City:
 Enoch "Nucky" Johnson - South Jersey/Atlantic City boss/host

New York/New Jersey:

 John "The Fox" Torrio - Former Chicago Torrio/Capone Gang boss/New York advisor
 Salvatore "Charles 'Lucky' Luciano" Lucania - Masseria Family lieutenant/New York
 Frank "The Prime Minister" Costello - Masseria Family lieutenant/New York
 Giuseppe "Joe Adonis" Doto - Masseria Family lieutenant/New York
 Vito Genovese - Masseria Family lieutenant/New York
 Guarino Moretti - Masseria Family lieutenant/New Jersey
 Vincent Mangano - D'Aquila/Mineo Family lieutenant/New York
 Frank Scalise - D'Aquila Mineo Family lieutenant/New York
 Albert Anastasia - D'Aquila/Mineo Family lieutenant/New York
 Gaetano "Tommy Brown" Lucchese - Riena Family lieutenant/New York
 Meyer "The Brain" Lansky - Bugs & Meyer Mob boss/New York
 Benjamin "Bugsy" Siegel - Bugs & Meyer Mob boss/New York
 Louis Buchalter - Buchalter/Shapiro Gang boss/New York
 Jacob Shapiro - Buchalter/Shapiro Gang boss/New York
 Dutch Schultz - Schultz Gang boss/New York
 Abner Zwillman - North Jersey/Zwillman Gang boss/New Jersey
 Owney Madden - Irish Combine boss/New York
 Frank Erickson - former Rothstein lieutenant/Costello associate/New York
 Tommy Gagliano - Riena Family underboss/New York
 Carlo Gambino - D'Aquila/Mineo Family lieutenant/New York

Chicago:
 Alphonse "Scarface" Capone - South Side/Capone Gang boss/Chicago
 Frank "The Enforcer" Nitti - South Side/Capone Gang lieutenant/Chicago
 Jake Guzik - South Side/Capone Gang lieutenant/Chicago
 Frank "Frank Cline" Rio - South Side/Capone bodyguard/Chicago
 Frank McErlane - Saltis/McErlane Gang boss/Chicago

Philadelphia:
 Waxey Gordon - Jewish Mob boss/Philly
 Max Hoff - Jewish Mob boss/Philly
 Harry Stromberg - Jewish Mob boss/Philly
 Irving Bitz - Jewish Mob boss/Philly
 Charles Schwartz - Jewish Mob boss/Philly
 Samuel Lazar Jewish Mob boss/Philly

Cleveland:
 Morris Dalitz - Little Jewish Navy boss/Cleveland
 Louis Rothkopf - Little Jewish Navy boss/Cleveland
 Leo Berkowitz - Little Jewish Navy/Mayfield Road Mob associate/Cleveland

Detroit:
 William Joseph Bernstein - Purple Gang boss/Detroit (a.k.a. "Bill Bugs")
 Abraham Bernstein - Purple Gang boss/Detroit

Kansas City:
 Giovanni Lazia - Pendergast Machine/Balestrere Gang lieutenant/Kansas City (a.k.a. Lazio)

New England:
 Charles Solomon - Jewish Mob boss/Boston
 Frank "The Cheeseman" Cucchiara - North End Gang/Buccola Family lieutenant/Boston
 Frank "Bootsy" Morelli - Morelli Gang boss/Providence

Florida:
 Santo Trafficante Sr. - Tampa Family underboss/Tampa

Louisiana:
 Sylvestro Corallo - Matranga/Giacona Family lieutenant/New Orleans

Problems identifying attendees
Some historians believe that representation at the conference was not representative of the ethnic make-up of the US criminal element, being that the delegations consisted of mostly Italian and Jewish crime leaders. Because of the lack of a substantial Irish delegation, a conclusion was made that this could have been the beginning of underworld domination by Italian and Jewish crime groups.

The Irish still possessed an influential presence in America's criminal and political worlds and had a number of dominant crime leaders in New York, Boston and Philadelphia. The most prominent and well-known Irish bosses of the time included Frank Wallace of Boston, Daniel "Danny" Walsh of Providence, George "Bugs" Moran, the South Side O'Donnells (brothers Edward (Spike), Steven, Tommy and Walter), the West Side O'Donnells (Klondike and Myles), William "Big Bill" Dwyer, Charles "Vannie" Higgins, Jack "Legs" Diamond and Vincent "Mad Dog" Coll of New York. Walsh was one of the leaders that many crime historians are unsure attended the meeting. Walsh was one of the most prominent Irish bootleggers of the Prohibition era, was an associate and partner of New York's Irish Combine leaders; Dwyer and Madden, and was an alleged member of the "Big Seven Group". This alone should have guaranteed his invitation, but some crime historians point to the fact that only two other Irish bosses were confirmed to be present at the meeting. Walsh's membership in the "Big Seven Group" and the fact that he was not killed until 1933, makes for a good argument to include him. But had he been present, he would have been only one of three Irish bosses in attendance.

Some crime historians, such as T. J. English, believe that the Italian and Jewish crime bosses did not invite the most prominent Irish bootleggers and criminals of the time to the Atlantic City Conference because they intended to marginalize them, along with the old guard or "Mustache Petes" that controlled the majority of criminal operations in the big cities. Some other historians do believe English is correct: The Italians and Jews wanted to marginalize the Irish bosses, and so did not invite them. Historians of organized crime note that the motivations were not out of some ethnic, racial hatred and nor was it out of sheer greed. The Irish had begun a type of criminal assimilation, leaving behind violent street rackets and moving onto more sophisticated types of organized illegality, such as taking over and corrupting the police force and local government of large cities.  As author T. J. English writes; "In later years, when Luciano or Meyer Lansky would ask, “What about the Irish? Who’s taking care of the Irish?” They didn’t mean Irish mobsters. They meant the Irish cops, politicians, and establishment figures who were ‘friendly.’ In the eyes of many Italian and Jewish gangsters, this was the fair and proper role for the Irish in the underworld; since they had ‘gotten here first,’ so to speak, and had infiltrated the upperworld, that was their function. The rest should be left to the Italians, Jews, Poles, and even the blacks." Perhaps owing to this theory, Frank Wallace was killed by hitters in Boston's Italian Mob in 1931 and Danny Walsh disappeared in 1933.

Whether or not there was a concerted plan to exclude them because of their ethnicity, several prominent Irish Mob bosses were left out of the conference, first and foremost, because they were currently engaged in full-scale gang warfare with rival Italian and Jewish bosses. Bugs Moran would have been the Irish boss to represent Chicago, despite any plan to marginalize Irish mobsters, but he had just missed being killed in the St. Valentine's Day Massacre when his gang was sizably decimated and he faded into obscurity soon after. The South Side and West Side O'Donnells of Chicago weren't as powerful as Moran and would not have been chosen to represent Chicago anyway, as they were at war with Al Capone and his allies. New York's Vannie Higgins, Legs Diamond and Vincent Coll might have been invited but were involved in the "Manhattan Beer Wars" against Jewish bosses Dutch Schultz, Waxey Gordon and Welsh boss, Owney Madden. At the Atlantic City Conference, Schultz was heard saying at the Ambassador Hotel. "This crazy maniac Coll is causing me no end of grief", were Gordon added, "Yeah, and what about this bastard, Legs Diamond? He's hijacking my trucks and raiding our clip joints all over North Jersey". Vannie Higgins was killed on January 19, 1932, in New York, Legs Diamond was shot three times and killed in his Albany, New York, hideout on December 18, 1931, and Mad Dog Coll was killed inside a New York phone booth by Schultz gunmen, while talking to Owney Madden on February 8, 1932.

Of note is the fate of Irish Mob boss Bill Dwyer.  He was not killed, nor was he forced out of the rackets by any other gangster, Italian or otherwise. Under his own volition, he retired from organized crime towards the end of Prohibition in 1932-33 and settled into life with his wife and five children in Belle Harbor, Queens. He died there in 1946 at the age of 63, after suffering a heart attack.

One Jewish criminal killed following the conference was Jewish Mob boss and Boston's most prominent crime leader and bootlegger, Charles "King" Solomon was killed at his Roxbury, Boston speakeasy, known as the Cotton Club on January 24, 1933. Law enforcement theorize that either Italian or Irish underworld leaders in the North End Buccola Family of Boston, Massachusetts, or the Walsh Mob of Providence, Rhode Island, had Solomon assassinated, either way, Solomon became another victim of the mob war for dominance in New England's underworld in the midst of the area's Prohibition wars. As Irish bosses Wallace and, (mostly likely), Walsh were killed by Boston's North End Italians, Solomon was most likely killed by them as well, being that Italian dominance was uncontested in the New England underworld thereafter, other than in South Boston, which was too heavily populated by the Irish.

Notes

References
 McPhaul, Jack. Johnny Torrio: The First of the Gang Lords. Arlington House, 1970.
 Messick, Hank. Lansky. Berkley Medallion, 1971.
 Gosch, Martin & Hammer, Richard. The Last Testament of Lucky Luciano. Dell Publishing Company, 1974.
 Wolf, George. Frank Costello: The Prime Minister of the Underworld. William Morrow & Company, 1974.
 Charbanneau, Jean Pierre. The Canadian Connection. Optimum Publishing, 1976.
 Fopiano, Willie & Harney, John. The Godson: A True Life Account of 20 Years Inside the Mob. St. Martins Press/Thomas Dunne Books, 1993.
 Time Life Books. True Crime: Mafia. Time Warner, 1993.
 Sifakis, Carl. The Mafia Encyclopedia: Second Edition. Checkmark Books, 1999.
 Reppetto, Thomas. The American Mafia: A History of Its Rise to Power. Henry Holt & Company, 2004.
 English, T. J. Paddy Wacked: The Untold Story of the Irish American Gangster. Regan Books, 2005.

External links
 Johnny "The Fox" Torrio: The Father of Modern American Gangsterdom by Allen May
 Waxey Gordon: Half A Century At Crime by Allen May
 Three Thin Dimes: The Demise of Larry Fay by Allen May
 Vannie Higgins: Brooklyn's Last Irish Boss by Allen May

Mafia meetings
Atlantic City, New Jersey
1929 conferences
Meyer Lansky
Lucky Luciano